Blackpool pier may refer to one of three piers in the English seaside resort town of Blackpool, in Lancashire:

North Pier, Blackpool
Central Pier, Blackpool
South Pier, Blackpool